is a Japanese "free announcer" from the Hokuriku region of Japan.

Biography
Kuruma was born in Takaoka, Japan. He attended school in Takaoka and graduated from the Nagoya information business college.

Professional career
Currently Kuruma has three radio programmes on three separate radio stations. These are "Manyo Multi Radio" on Radio Takaoka (Friday, 12pm to 5pm), Korinbo Five Station" on Radio Kanazawa (Wednesday, 5pm to 6pm), "Furari ki mamani" on Toyama City FM.

He also does freelance work as an MC at weddings and other functions in the Hokuriku, Nagoya and Tokyo areas.

References

External links
 Company Website 

Living people
People from Toyama Prefecture
Year of birth missing (living people)